Wendell is a name of uncertain origin.  It may derive from the Germanic Wenden (to travel) or possibly from the term Wend, the historical name of a Slavic people living in Germany.

Notable people with the name Wendell include:

First name 
Wendell Alexis, American basketball player
Wendell Anderson, American politician from Minnesota
Wendell Berry, American novelist, poet, essayist and farmer
Wendell Nascimento Borges, Brazilian football defender
Wendell Brown, American computer scientist, entrepreneur, and inventor
Wendell Bryant, American football player
Wendell Butcher, American football player
Wendell Burton, American actor and singer
Wendell Carter Jr., American Basketball Player for the NBA's Chicago Bulls
Wendell H. Ford, American politician from Kentucky
Wendell Johnson, American psychologist and author
Wendell Lawrence, Bahamian triple jumper 
Wendell Lucena Ramalho, Brazilian football goalkeeper and coach
Wendell Moore (disambiguation), multiple people
Wendell H. Murphy, American politician from North Carolina
Wendell Cushing Neville, Commandant of the United States Marine Corps
Wendell Phillips, American abolitionist and activist from Massachusetts
Wendell Pierce, American actor
Wendell Pritchett, American educator
Wendell Ramos, Filipino actor
Wendell Sailor, Australian dual-code rugby international
Wendell Scott, American NASCAR driver who was the first African-American to win a race in the NASCAR Cup Series
Wendell Smith, African-American sportswriter
Wendell Meredith Stanley, Nobel Prize-winning biochemist and virologist
Wendell Craig Williams, Pennsylvania State Representative
Wendell Willkie, Republican Party nominee for the 1940 U.S. presidential election (lost to Franklin D. Roosevelt)

Middle name 
Oliver Wendell Holmes, Sr., poet and essayist
Oliver Wendell Holmes, Jr., Justice of the U.S. Supreme Court

Surname 
Barrett Wendell, American academic
David Wendell, award-winning scientist
Howard Wendell (1908–1975), American actor
James Wendell, 1912 Olympic silver medalist
James A. Wendell, New York State Comptroller 1921–1922
Krissy Wendell, American ice hockey player
Marty Wendell, American football player
Nathan D. Wendell, New York State Treasurer 1880–1881
Percy Langdon Wendell, Harvard football captain
Turk Wendell, American baseball player 1993–2004

Fictional people 
 Wendell Borton, a recurring character on the television series The Simpsons
 Wendel "Wen" Gifford, a character in the young adult novel Lemonade Mouth
 Wendell, a character from the cartoon series Mike, Lu, and Og
 Wendell Fidget, a recurring character on the television series Sofia the First
 Wendell Bray, one of the interns of Temperance Brennan from the series Bones

See also
Wendel (name)

References